Gaines Lawson (September 4, 1840 – September 12, 1906) was a soldier in the Union Army and a Medal of Honor recipient for his actions in the American Civil War.

Lawson joined the 4th (East) Tennessee Infantry in December 1862, and mustered out with this regiment in August 1865. He was commissioned in the regular army in July 1866, and retired in September 1892.

Medal of Honor citation
Rank and organization: First Sergeant, Company D, 4th East Tennessee Infantry. Place and date: At Minville, Tenn., October 3, 1863. Entered service at: Tennessee. Born: 1841, Hawkins County, Tenn. Date of issue: June 11, 1895.

Citation:

Went to the aid of a wounded comrade between the lines and carried him to a place of safety.

See also

List of Medal of Honor recipients
List of American Civil War Medal of Honor recipients: G–L

References

External links

1840 births
1906 deaths
People from Hawkins County, Tennessee
United States Army Medal of Honor recipients
Union Army soldiers
People of Tennessee in the American Civil War
American Civil War recipients of the Medal of Honor
Southern Unionists in the American Civil War